John Catlin (born November 15, 1990) is an American professional golfer who plays on the European Tour and the Asian Tour. He has won three times on the European Tour and has also won four times on the Asian Tour.

Amateur career
Catlin was born and grew up in Sacramento, California, United States. He picked up the game from an early age and found a lot of success as an amateur, winning consecutive NCGA State Match Play Championships in 2010 and 2011, and Memorial Amateur Championships in 2011 and 2012. Catlin then went on to play for the University of New Mexico where he was an Academic All-American and an honorable mention NCAA All-American in 2012. In the same year he also won the Arizona Intercollegiate and was named UNM Student-Athlete of the year.

Professional career
Catlin turned professional in 2013, he started his first season as a professional playing on the PGA Tour Canada. He then went on to play on the Asian Development Tour full-time, capturing two wins between 2016 and 2017.

Catlin's biggest success to date, came in the 2018 Asian Tour season where he won three times. This success awarded him the Asian Tour's player of the year honors. Furthermore, this success also gave him European Tour status for the 2019 season. Catlin won the 2019 Thailand Open in a three-man playoff to claim his fourth victory on the Asian Tour.

In August 2020, Catlin became the first player to be withdrawn from a tournament on the European Tour due to violating the tour's COVID-19 safety protocols, after he and his caddie went to a restaurant in the days leading up to the English Championship. A month later, Catlin won his first European Tour event at the Estrella Damm N.A. Andalucía Masters, completing a wire-to-wire victory when Martin Kaymer made a bogey on the final hole to fall into second place. Three weeks after his first European Tour win, Catlin won again at the Dubai Duty Free Irish Open, shooting a final-round 64 to beat Aaron Rai by two strokes.

In April 2021, Catlin claimed his third victory on the European Tour at the Austrian Golf Open. He defeated Maximilian Kieffer in a five-hole playoff.

Professional wins (10)

European Tour wins (3)

European Tour playoff record (1–0)

Asian Tour wins (4)

1Co-sanctioned by the China Tour

Asian Tour playoff record (1–0)

Asian Development Tour wins (2)

1Co-sanctioned by the PGA Tour of Indonesia
2Co-sanctioned by the Professional Golf of Malaysia Tour

All Thailand Golf Tour wins (1)

Results in major championships

CUT = missed the half-way cut

Results in World Golf Championships

"T" = Tied

References

External links
 
 
 
 
 

American male golfers
New Mexico Lobos men's golfers
European Tour golfers
Asian Tour golfers
Golfers from Sacramento, California
1990 births
Living people